is a brewery owned by the German state of Baden-Württemberg. Rothaus, at the northern edge of the village of Grafenhausen in the southern Black Forest, is one of Germany's most successful and profitable regional breweries.

History

Rothaus received its name from the patrician family "Roth", which originated from the region of Klettgau and settled down in Grafenhausen around 1300 AD. In 1340, they began the construction of their homestead there, the “” (Ger.: "The Red House"). In 1660, the house was sold to a man named Michael Kaiser who would then proceed to turn it into an Inn after obtaining a liquor license from the Benedictine monastery of St. Blasien. The order itself bought the premises 100 years later and reconstructed it.

Under the leadership of Martin Gerbert, prince-abbot of the abbey, the monks' council decided in late 1790 to start attempts of brewing in January 1791. Gerbert's intention was to enhance the status of his lordship of Bonndorf over the nearby princedom of Fürstenberg. Fürstenberg had been in possession of a brewing license since the 13th century and would later originate the “” (Fürstenberg Brewery). Additionally, the brewery was a measure of economic promotion, as it was intended to create employment and to counteract the allegedly overpriced beer from Donaueschingen. However, there were claims that the monks had only wanted to suppress the drinking of liquor by those living in the Black Forest.

Considering the nearby towns of St. Blasien and Bonndorf, the location of the brewery was very convenient in terms of infrastructure; it was surrounded by large areas covered with woods and an abundance of fresh water. This enabled the starting of an extensive brewery firm. To this day, the brewing water is extracted from seven in-house wells.

Through the process of secularization, the possession of the monastery and its properties was transferred to the Grand Duchy of Baden in 1806. Since 1922, the company has had the legal form of a stock corporation, the shares of which are currently held entirely by the associated company of the state of Baden-Württemberg.

Between 1920 and 1933, Max Jäger, later mayor of the city of Rastatt, was the Rothaus brewery's manager. Under CEO Norbert Nothhelfer, who had previously been a district president of Freiburg, Rothaus doubled its beer sales in a shrinking market in the 1990s. Capacity was increased to one million hectolitres per year. In 1992, Rothaus acquired the Dominican Island of Constance including the island resort on it, which is leased to the Steigenberger Hotel Group. On 1 October 2004, Thomas Schäuble, former Minister of the Interior of Baden-Württemberg, became CEO of the brewery.

In the fiscal year 2006, the brewery achieved a production volume of 937,000 hectoliters and revenue of 88.2 million Euros, making it the second largest brewery in the state after Eichbaum. Approximately 90 percent of the brewery's sales are made in Baden-Württemberg.

Near the end of 2007, Rothaus acquired the hotel next to the brewery area and set up a fan shop there. Within an area of about one hectare a small adventure park containing the Zäpfleweg, which opened in 2008, as well as a playground, were created. In addition, state road 170 was relocated and a roundabout was built in order to make it more attractive as a destination.  a total of 232 people are employed in Rothaus and its two sales offices.

After Thomas Schäuble became seriously ill, Gerhard Stratthaus, former Finance Minister of Baden-Württemberg, took over the management of the brewery on 5 September 2012. Since 1 July 2013, the company has been managed by Christian Rasch.

Rasch is the first nonpolitician in decades to be the manager of the State Brewery. It used to be common practice for former state governments to fill state-owned enterprises' leadership positions with former politicians. This practice, however, sparked much public criticism. Hence, agriculture minister Alexander Bonde arranged the first job advertisement for this position. Egon Zehnder's Swiss headhunter company was hired to assist with the job advertisement. Rasch had been sales and marketing manager of the Stuttgarter Hofbräu brewery since 2008, and became the management's spokesperson in 2010. The newspaper "" described Rasch's switch from Stuttgarter Hofbräu to Rothaus as "spectacular" because to the circumstances under which it happened.

In 2016, the brand "Tannenzäpfle" celebrated its 60th year of existence with a sixtieth anniversary edition of the original 1956 label design.

Products

The brewery's most successful product, a Pilsner-style beer, "" or simply "", is sold in  bottles and is available in stores throughout Baden-Württemberg. It is well known as a "cult beer" throughout Germany and is sold in supermarkets, kiosks and various nightlife establishments.  literally means "little fir cone" and is a reference to the shape of the bottle. Despite Rothaus refraining from intensive advertising campaigns, the demand for the once-local beer has spread throughout Germany.

Label 
Every bottle’s label displays a blonde girl in a traditional garb, holding a beer in each of her hands. Fans of the beer started to call her “Biergit Kraft” which is a play on words in the local dialect of Alemannic. "Bier git Kraft", ("Bier gibt Kraft") translates to "beer gives [you] strength". By now, the brewery also uses the name in commercials.  

Also depicted on the Tannenzäpfle label are seven fir cones which lead to the beers name. Interestingly, instead of hanging downwards as in the image, in nature these cones grow upwards from their branches. The inverted position of the cones is commonly noted to be similar to the position of a bottle while it is being consumed. In reality however, the cones depicted on the label are probably the seeds of the Norway spruce, which naturally grows in the Black Forest and has its cones hanging down from its branches. 

The current label has been in use since 1972. The girl and fir cones were introduced in the first label in 1956 as part of a photorealistic illustration. The original label was used again as a limited edition in 2006 on the occasion of the 50th anniversary of the brand.

Advertising 
Rothaus does advertisements throughout the German states of Baden-Württemberg, Rhineland-Palatinate, North-Rhine-Westphalia, Hamburg and Hesse, though they completely abstain the usage of TV- and radio commercials. The company does sponsor sports clubs like, among others, the SC Freiburg, Karlsruher SC, FC Nöttingen, VfR Aalen and Wölfe Freiburg as well as various events throughout the region. They not only own the right to a name for the venues of the Messe Friedrichshafen (Rothaus Halle) and Messe Freiburg (Rothaus-Arena from 2007-2016), but also for the park of the Messe Stuttgart (Rothauspark). In other sports, the brewery is main sponsor for the Rothaus cycling team and the HSG Konstanz, a handball team currently playing in the 2. Handball-Bundesliga. Through sponsorship they also lend their name to the Rothaus Regio-Tour.

Rothaus was involved in the construction of the Rothaus-Zäpfle-Turm, which is an observation tower near the township of Höchenschwand. They also own two refrigerator cars in a railway look which are parked in Seebrugg at the Bundesstraße 500 and work as a permanent advertisement – at the exact spot, where the road branches off to Rothaus. 

The region the brewery is located in, has branded itself “Rothauser Land – Meine Ferienregion im Schwarzwald” (my vacation destination in the Black Forest) since 2006. “Rothauser Land” includes the main cities Grafenhausen and Ühlingen-Birkendorf. As a brand recognition they even included the brewery’s characters into their logo.

Economic significance

The brewery experienced a doubling of its output in the 1990s under the direction of the new chairman of the board, Norbert Nothelfer, who had previously been employed in a position comparable to governor of a sub-division of a state. This, while noteworthy in itself, is more remarkable in light of the recent trend of decreasing beer consumption by Germans. The capacity was increased to one million hectoliters of beer. In the business year 2008, the brewery produced  of beer, grossing roughly €89.2 million.

The company is an important employer in the otherwise economically weak area of the south-central Black Forest. In 2008, the brewery employed 230 people and paid €17 million as dividends to its owner, the state of Baden-Württemberg. It also paid €16.7 million in tax. Next to Fürstenberg Brewery, it is one of the two larger breweries in the south-west of Baden-Württemberg.

References

External links 
  Rothaus.de, official website
  http://www.zum.de/Faecher/G/BW/Landeskunde/rhein/wirtschaft/brau/rothaus/index.htm

Beer brands of Germany
Breweries in Germany
Breweries in Baden-Württemberg
Companies based in Baden-Württemberg
Pages translated from German Wikipedia
Government-owned companies of Germany
German companies established in 1791
Food and drink companies established in 1791